Takehiro Kubo (born 19 July 1978) is a Japanese lightweight rower.

Career 
Kubo won a gold medal at the 2000 World Rowing Championships in Zagreb with the lightweight men's quadruple scull.

References

1978 births
Living people
Japanese male rowers
World Rowing Championships medalists for Japan
Asian Games medalists in rowing
Rowers at the 2002 Asian Games
Rowers at the 2006 Asian Games
Asian Games silver medalists for Japan
Medalists at the 2002 Asian Games